Devil's staircase may refer to:

Places 
 a path through the Aonach Eagach ridge, Scotland
 Devil's Staircase (New Zealand), a section of New Zealand State Highway 6 in Otago
 a feature on the Afon Irfon in the Cambrian Mountains, Wales
 a waterfall on the Coosa River at Wetumpka, Alabama, U.S.
 a descent on the Peak Cavern caves in Castleton, Derbyshire, England
 a path in The Silverpeaks, New Zealand
 a ridge in the White Cloud Mountains, Idaho, U.S.
 a road in Ohiya, Sri Lanka
 an intrusion dike near Sambro Island Light, near Halifax Harbour, Nova Scotia, Canada
 Devil's Staircase Wilderness, a nature reserve in the Oregon Coast Range, U.S.

Arts and entertainment
 L'Escalier du diable, the thirteenth of the Études, Book II by György Ligeti
 The Devil's Staircase, a 2009 novel by Helen FitzGerald
 The Devil's Staircase, a 2011 production by Santa Clara Vanguard Drum and Bugle Corps

Other uses
 a singular function in mathematics
 Cantor function
 Baguenaudier, a disentanglement puzzle